= 2022 Kuwaiti municipal elections =

Elections in Kuwait

2022 Kuwaiti Municipal election
- 21 May 2022
- 10 of the 16 seats in the Municipal Council
- Turnout: 22.32%

Municipal elections were held in Kuwait on 21 May 2022 to elect 10 of the 16 members of the Municipal Council. Thirty-eight candidates including one woman ran in eight constituencies. The elections were held in 443 committees distributed over 76 schools. The number of registered voters were 438,283.

== Candidates ==
Any Kuwaiti-born citizen who is 30 years of age on election day, who is able to read and write in Arabic and has not been convicted of a felony or a crime involving breach of honor or trust is eligible to run for office. Registration of candidates took place between 14 and 23 April 2022.

Forty candidates including one woman, Zainab Al-Hasawi, registered in the ten constituencies. Two got immediate victory after running unopposed, an event occurring for the first in Kuwait’s electoral history.

== Results ==
No elections were held in the seventh and tenth constituencies due to having one applicant registering in the election, giving them automatic victory per local laws.

Turnout in the 2022 election was 22.32%. Only three out of the ten members of 2018 Municipal Council, Hassan Kamal, Abdulaziz Al-Mehri and Fuhaid Al-Muwaizri, kept their seats. Resulting in a rate of change of 70%. No women won in this election.

=== Elected members ===
Constituency	Candidate	Votes
First	Hassan Ali Kamal	2,755
Second	Abdullah Abdulaziz Al-Mehri	4,331
Third	Fahad Musaed Al-Abduljader	2,510
Fourth	Soud Abdulrahman Al-Kandari	5,861
Fifth	Nasser Mardhi Al-Jadaan	4,331
Sixth	Fuhaid Fahaad Al-Muwaizri	5,235
Seventh	Khaled Mufleh Al-Mutairi	Unopposed
Eighth	Abdullah Owaid Al-Enezi	9,893
Ninth	Nasser Hamaad Al-Kafeef	13,401
Tenth	Nassar Rajaan Al-Azmi	Unopposed
Source: KUNA

== Aftermath ==
On May 31, the Cabinet of Kuwait approved the six appointed members which included four women. They are Muneera Al-Amir, Shareefa Al-Shalfan, Alyaa Al-Farsi, Farah Al-Ruomi, Ismael Behbehani and Abdulateef Al-Deei. The first session took place on 8 June 2022. During the opening session, Abdulaziz Al-Mehri was elected as speaker of Municipal Council unopposed. Khaled Al-Mutairi was also elected unopposed as Deputy speaker.

== By-election ==
The Municipal council announced on 22 April 2024, the vacancy of the sixth and ninth constituencies (two members of the municipal council in the 13th legislative term). The Ministry of Justice and Ministry of Interior addressed reports to the Minister of State for Municipal Affairs with respect to affirming that Al-Kafif had been acquitted of a verdict and Al Muwaizri registered as candidate for the parliament elections 2024. Hence, by-elections were to be held on 18 May 2024 for the sixth and ninth constituencies. On 18 May 2024, ten nominees contested for the sixth constituency with over 79,754 voters registered and eight nominees contested for the ninth constituency with over 134,683 voters registered. The by-elections took place between 8 am until 8 pm in 194 polling stations organized at 26 schools. Waleed Al-Dagher and Fahad Al-Ajmi won seats of the sixth and ninth constituencies, respectively. Each received 3,322 and 10,404 votes respectively.
